A Man, a Woman, and a Bank, also known as A Very Big Withdraw, is a 1979 Canadian comedy crime film directed by Noel Black and starring Donald Sutherland, Brooke Adams and Paul Mazursky. The film was partially funded by McNichol, a production company formed by teenage actress Kristy McNichol, her manager-mother Carollyne and their representatives. This is the only film the McNichol team produced.

Plot
A thief, Reese Halperin, and his accomplice, computer expert Norman Barrie, devise a scheme to break into a Vancouver bank.

While carrying out the bank's blueprints, Reese is inadvertently photographed by Stacey Bishop, who is taking pictures for the bank's advertising campaign. Reese and Stacey meet, and, complicating the burglary somewhat, fall in love.

Cast
 Donald Sutherland as Reese Halperin 
 Brooke Adams as Stacey Bishop 
 Paul Mazursky as Norman Barrie
 Allan Kolman as Peter (as Allan Magicovsky)
 Leigh Hamilton as Marie
 Kung-Wu Huang as Mr. Tsang (as Tony Lee)

Release
The film premiered with a gala presentation at the Toronto International Film Festival on September 8, 1979.

References

External links
 
 

1979 films
1970s crime comedy films
1979 romantic comedy films
1970s heist films
Canadian crime comedy films
Embassy Pictures films
English-language Canadian films
Films about bank robbery
Films directed by Noel Black
Films scored by Bill Conti
Films set in Vancouver
Canadian heist films
1970s English-language films
1970s Canadian films